The women's 400 metre freestyle was a swimming event held as part of the swimming at the 1928 Summer Olympics programme. It was the second appearance of the event, which was established in 1924 after 1920 a 300-metre event was held. The competition was held from Saturday to Monday, 4 to 6 August 1928.

Twenty swimmers from nine nations competed.

Records
These were the standing world and Olympic records (in minutes) prior to the 1928 Summer Olympics.

In the first heat Martha Norelius set a new world record with 5:45.4 minutes. In the final she bettered her own record to 5:42.8 minutes.

Results

Heats

Saturday 4 August 1928: The fastest two in each heat and the fastest third-placed from across the heats advanced.

Heat 1

Heat 2

Heat 3

Heat 4

Semifinals

Sunday 5 August 1928: The fastest three in each semi-final advanced to the final.

Semifinal 1

Semifinal 2

Final

Monday 6 August 1928:

References

External links
Olympic Report
 

Swimming at the 1928 Summer Olympics
1928 in women's swimming
Swim